Teversall Manor is a former railway station in Teversal, Nottinghamshire on the Derbyshire border west of Mansfield.

Ambiguity
There were two stations in Teversal, one built by the Midland Railway on a line running south–north from Whiteborough to Pleasley West, the other by built the Great Northern Railway at the end of a one-mile branch line westwards from Skegby.

Despite being fully equipped with a building and platform, the Great Northern station only ever carried unadvertised workmen's trains and seaside excursions. It does not appear in the 1922 "Bradshaw's Guide" or later timetables. It was visited by a Stephenson Locomotive Society "Farewell" enthusiasts' special on 4 May 1968.

The ex-Midland line bridged the ex-GNR line in Teversal and the stations were fairly close to each other, the ex-Midland station being on the higher level.

From inception they were both called "Teversall" with two "l"s.

After nationalisation in 1948 the early British Railways had a policy of renaming stations where confusion over names could occur, typically in towns and villages where two or more stations existed. Teversal had two stations, so, although one had closed to regular passenger services and the other had never provided any, they provided other services such as goods and excursions. They were therefore renamed.

The ex-MR Teversal station became "Teversall Manor" and the ex-GNR Teversal station became "Teversall East".

This article concerns the ex-Midland railway station on the line from Tibshelf and Whiteborough to Pleasley.

Context
The station was built by the Midland Railway on the circuitous Mansfield to Westhouses via Mansfield Woodhouse and Tibshelf line known as "The Teversall & Pleasley Branch". The line's primary purpose was to carry coal.

History
The station was opened without ceremony on 1 May 1886 when the Teversall & Pleasley Branch opened to passenger traffic. It initially provided a service of four trains each way between Mansfield and Alfreton via Mansfield Woodhouse, Tevershall and Tibshelf, taking about 40 minutes from end to end.

The station had a typical Midland Railway country station building very similar to Pleasley West.

By 1922 the passenger service through the station was down to three trains each way Monday to Saturday. There never was a Sunday service. By 1930 this had fallen to one train a day southbound and, curiously, two a day northbound. On 28 July 1930 passenger services were withdrawn.

As the station remained open for goods it was renamed "Teversall Manor" in 1950 to avoid confusion with the obscure ex-GNR terminus station nearby.

Excursions and railtours continued until 1963.

Through traffic was rendered impossible from 1964 when the line North from Pleasley Colliery to the junction with what is now the Robin Hood Line closed. Pleasley Colliery subsequently sent its coal underground to Shirebrook and Teversall Colliery closed in 1980. Coal continued to be dug from Silverhill Colliery until 1992 and passed through the site of Teversall Manor station. After the colliery closed the line became redundant and was subsequently lifted.

The station buildings have been razed to the ground.

Parts of the trackbed of this and neighbouring lines have been turned into public footpaths and bridleways.

References

External links
Teversall railway station on navigable 1947 O.S. Map

Other Reading

Disused railway stations in Nottinghamshire
Former Midland Railway stations
Railway stations in Great Britain opened in 1886
Railway stations in Great Britain closed in 1930
Ashfield District